Ronald Elusma (born 8 September 1993, in Petite Rivière de l'Artibonite, Haiti) is a Haitian footballer who currently plays for America des Cayes.

Career
Elusma played for Victory SC since 2011
, and was transferred July 2015 to America des Cayes. He was selected by the Haiti national football team to play for the 2015 CONCACAF Gold Cup.

References

External links
 
 Ronald Elusma profile at Footballdatabase.eu

1993 births
Living people
Haitian footballers
People from Artibonite (department)
Ligue Haïtienne players
2013 CONCACAF Gold Cup players
2015 CONCACAF Gold Cup players
Haiti international footballers
Association football goalkeepers